Sea Point High School, formerly Sea Point Boys' High School, is a co-educational public high school in Main Road, Sea Point, Cape Town, South Africa. The school was established on 21 April 1884. In 1925, the senior grades were separated from the junior grades. In 1989, the school merged with Ellerslie Girls' High School after becoming co-educational.

Headmasters and principals 
George Hosking, B.A., 1884–1902
J. Longwill, M.A., 1902–1904
Thomas Young, M.A., 1904–1928
C. H. Anderson, M.A., 1929–1938
Ronald Graham, M.A., 1938–1947
A. D. Dodd, M.A., M.Ed., 1947–1969
John Gibbon, Ph.D. 
Philip Gurney, M.A., M.Ed., 1996-1998 
Douglas Quick, 1998-2000 (until death due to brain tumour)
Marina Kaichis, 2000-mid 2007
C.B. Murison
B. Probyn
Pieter Botha,  Bachelor's Degree, Teaching Diploma, 2013 -2017
Rondene Richards (acting) 2017-2019
Leana Le Breton, B.A., HDE, ACE(EMLD), 2019 (current)

Notable alumni 

Graham Armitage, British actor
Gerry Brand – Springbok rugby player from 1928 to 1938
Sir Ronald Harwood, CBE, FRSL – British author, playwright and screenwriter
 Sir Antony Sher, KBE – British actor, writer and theatre director
Derek Miles Yellon – Medical researcher

References

Refer to the book compiled by Frank Quinn, who was a history teacher at the school. Book is titled "Beneath the Lion Bold; a History of the Sea Point Boys High School'.

Schools in Cape Town
High schools in South Africa
Educational institutions established in 1884
1884 establishments in the Cape Colony